P. I. Filimonov (real name Roman Fokin; born on 4 March 1975) is a Russian-Estonian writer who lives in Estonia.

Selected works
 2010: novel "Mitteeukleidilise geomeetria tsoon"
 2011: poetry collection "Väärastuste käsiraamat"
 2013: novel "Thalassa, Thalassa!"

References

External links
 P. I. Filimonov at Estonian Writers' Online Dictionary

Living people
1975 births
Russian male writers
Estonian male poets
Estonian male novelists
21st-century Estonian poets
21st-century Estonian novelists
Russian male poets
Russian male novelists
21st-century Russian poets
21st-century Russian novelists
Estonian people of Russian descent
Tallinn University alumni